Die Loreley is an opera by Max Bruch to a German-language libretto by Emanuel Geibel, originally intended for Felix Mendelssohn.

Bruch did not complete the work until 1863. The opera was premiered in that year.

References

External links

Operas
Compositions by Max Bruch
1863 operas
German-language operas